Eupithecia cimicifugata is a moth in the family Geometridae first described by Pearsall in 1908. It is found in North America, including Alberta, Ontario, Saskatchewan, Kentucky, Maryland and South Dakota.

The larvae feed on the fruit of Cimicifuga racemosa.

References

Moths described in 1908
cimicifugata
Moths of North America